The Royal Society is the second album by the British rock band The Eighties Matchbox B-Line Disaster, released in the UK on 25 October 2004 on the No Death label.

It was produced by Chris Goss of Masters of Reality. The album is a lot longer and less frantic than its immediate predecessor, showing the band's progression.

This is the last album to feature Andy Huxley on guitar.

Track listing
"Rise of the Eagles" (Andy Huxley & TEMBLD) - 2.45
"I Could Be an Angle" (Tom Diamantopoulo & TEMBLD) - 3.23
"When I Hear You Call My Name"  (Sym Gharial & TEMBLD) - 3.59
"Migrate Migraine" (Tom Diamantopoulo & TEMBLD) - 3.18
"Puppy Dog Snails" (Marc Norris & TEMBLD) - 3.54
"The Dancing Girls" (Tom Diamantopoulo & TEMBLD) - 3.09
"The Fool" (Tom Diamantopoulo & TEMBLD) - 3.08
"I Rejection"  (Andy Huxley & TEMBLD) - 4.14
"Drunk on the Blood" (Tom Diamantopoulo & TEMBLD) - 5.30
"Mister Mental" (Tom Diamantopoulo & TEMBLD) - 2.53
"Freud's Black Muck" (Andy Huxley & TEMBLD) - 3.39
"Temple Music" (Tom Diamantopoulo & TEMBLD) - 3.10 
"The Way Of The Men Of The Stuff" (Andy Huxley & TEMBLD) - 3.23

B-sides
Amongst the list of B-sides below, live tracks, demo versions, cover versions, remixes and videos were also released on most of the singles from the album.

Personnel
Guy McKnight – vocals
Marc Norris – guitar
Andy Huxley – guitar
Sym Gharial – bass
Tom Diamantopoulo – drums

Singles

References

External links

2004 albums
Albums produced by Chris Goss
Psychobilly albums
The Eighties Matchbox B-Line Disaster albums